Lagg may refer to:
Lagg, Arran, North Ayrshire, Scotland
, see Arran distillery
Lagg, Jura, Argyll and Bute, Scotland
Lagg (landform)
Lavochkin-Gorbunov-Gudkov LaGG-1, a Soviet fighter aircraft of World War II
Lavochkin-Gorbunov-Gudkov LaGG-3, a Soviet fighter aircraft of World War II

See also 
 Lag (disambiguation)